Gauthier de Costes, seigneur de la Calprenède (1609 or 1610 – 1663) was a French novelist and dramatist.  He was born at the Château of Tolgou in Salignac-Eyvigues (Dordogne). After studying at Toulouse, he came to Paris and entered the regiment of the guards, becoming in 1650 gentleman-in-ordinary of the royal household. He died in 1663 in consequence of a kick from his horse.

La Calprenède wrote several long heroic romances that were later ridiculed by Boileau, and most of them were also referenced in Charlotte Lennox's The Female Quixote. They are: Cassandre (5 vols., 1642–1650); Cléopâtre (1648); Faramond (1661); and Les Nouvelles, ou les Divertissements de la princesse Alcidiane (1661) published under his wife's name, but generally attributed to him. His Le Comte d'Essex, produced in 1638, supplied some ideas to Thomas Corneille for his tragedy of the same name.

Works online 
 Édouard, 1640
 Phalante, 1642
 Herménigilde, 1643
 Jeanne, reyne d’Angleterre, 1638
 La Bradamante, 1637
 La Mort de Mitridate, 1637
 La Mort des enfants d’Hérodes, ou Suite de Mariane, 1639
 Le Clarionte, ou le Sacrifice sanglant, 1637
 Le Comte d’Essex, 1638

References

17th-century births
1663 deaths
People from Dordogne
17th-century French dramatists and playwrights
17th-century French male writers
17th-century French novelists
Deaths by horse-riding accident in France
French male novelists
French male dramatists and playwrights